A calorie can be any of two units of heat or food energy ("small" and "large"). The word may also refer to:
 Calories (story) a 1951 novel by L. Sprague deCamp
 Calorie Kun Vs. Moguranian, a video game
 Calorie restriction, a dietary regime
 Calorie count laws for restaurant chains
 Empty calorie, calorie provided by food without other essential nutrients
 CalorieMate, a Japanese brand of energy-supplement foods
 CalorieKing, a company offering weight loss products and services
 Good Calories, Bad Calories a 2007 book by Gary Taubes
 CR Society International, formerly Calorie Restriction Society
 CALERIE, a food research program by the Pennington Biomedical Research Center